Team Farto–BTC is a Spanish women's road bicycle racing team, established in 2018, which participates in elite women's races.

Major results
2022
La Classique Morbihan, Antri Christoforou

National Champions
2020
 Portugal Road Race, Melissa Maia

References

External links

UCI Women's Teams
Cycling teams based in Spain
Cycling teams established in 2021